Pieternella Hendrika "Henny" Vegter (born 28 February 1958, in Rotterdam) is a sailor from the Netherlands, who represented her country at the 1988 Summer Olympics in Pusan. With Marion Bultman as crew, Vegter took the 13th place in the 470 Female. Vegter and Bultman were, with the exception of Mej. C. de Visser – substitute for the Star in 1936 –, the first female sailing competitors in the 88 years of Dutch Olympic sailing history.

Further reading

1988 Olympics (Pusan)

References

1958 births
Living people
Dutch female sailors (sport)
Olympic sailors of the Netherlands
Sailors at the 1988 Summer Olympics – 470
Sportspeople from Rotterdam
20th-century Dutch women
21st-century Dutch women